Nimrod was launched in 1799 in Delaware or in Philadelphia, possibly under another name. She first appeared in Lloyd's Register (LR) in 1810 as a West Indiaman. In 1815 she was listed as being employed in the Seas Seas Fishery. She was last listed in 1820.

Career
Nimrod first appeared in LR in 1810.

 

Lloyd's Lists Ship arrival and departure (SAD) information carries no mention of her.

Fate
Nimrod was last listed in the Register of Shipping in 1816 and in LR in 1820.

Citations and references
Citations

References
 

1799 ships
Ships built in the United States
Age of Sail merchant ships of England
Whaling ships